Cool Breeze  (born 12 August 1971) is an American rapper and member of the Dungeon Family. He released his debut solo album East Point's Greatest Hit in 1999. In 2001, he joined up with two rappers from a group called Sniper Unit and became known as Freddie Calhoun. He features on and is the origin to the title phrase of the 1996 Billboard 100 single "Dirty South" on Goodie Mob's debut album Soul Food. His 1998 single "Watch for the Hook" featuring Goodie Mob, Outkast, and Witchdoctor reached the Billboard 100 and #1 on the Billboard Rap charts.

Discography

Albums
East Point's Greatest Hit (1999)
Made in the Dirty South (with the Calhouns) (2002)

Singles
"Cre-A-Tine"
"Watch for the Hook"
"Decatur Psalm"
"Angelic Wars"
"Gangsta Partna"
"Dirty South"
"Hhl (Hip Hop League)" (feat. Organized Noize)

Filmography
Mystery Men

References

External links
Cool Breeze on Myspace

Dungeon Family members
Living people
1971 births
Place of birth missing (living people)
American rappers